Stephen Kinzer (born August 4, 1951) is an American author, journalist, and academic. A former New York Times correspondent, he has published several books, and writes for several newspapers and news agencies.

Reporting career
During the 1980s, Kinzer covered revolutions and social upheaval in Central America, and wrote his first book, Bitter Fruit, about military coups and destabilization in Guatemala during the 1950s. In 1990, The New York Times appointed Kinzer to head its Berlin bureau, from which he covered Eastern and Central Europe as they emerged from Soviet bloc. Kinzer was The New York Times chief in the newly established Istanbul bureau from 1996 to 2000.

Upon returning to the U.S., Kinzer became the newspaper's culture correspondent, based in Chicago, as well as teaching at Northwestern University. He then took up residence in Boston and began teaching journalism and U.S. foreign policy at Boston University. He has written several nonfiction books about Turkey, Central America, Iran, and the U.S. overthrow of foreign governments from the late 19th century to the present, as well as Rwanda's recovery from genocide.

Kinzer also contributes columns to The New York Review of Books, The Guardian, and The Boston Globe. He is a Senior Fellow in International and Public Affairs at the Watson Institute for International and Public Affairs at Brown University.

Views
Kinzer's reporting on Central America was criticized by Edward S. Herman and Noam Chomsky in their book Manufacturing Consent (1988), which cited Edgar Chamorro ("selected by the CIA as press spokesman for the contras") in his interview by Fairness and Accuracy in Reporting describing Kinzer as "just responding what the White House is saying". In chapter 2 of Manufacturing Consent, Kinzer is criticized for deploying no skepticism in his coverage of the murders of GAM (mutual support group) leaders in Guatemala and for "generally employ[ing] an apologetic framework" for the Guatemalan military state.

Kinzer has since that time criticized what he regards as interventionist U.S. foreign policy toward Latin America and more recently the Middle East. In Overthrow: America's Century of Regime Change From Hawaii to Iraq (2006), he critiqued U.S. foreign policy as overly interventionist. In a 2010 interview with Imagineer Magazine, he said:

In his 2008 book A Thousand Hills: Rwanda's Rebirth and the Man who Dreamed It, Kinzer credits President Paul Kagame for what he calls the peace, development, and stability in Rwanda in the years after the Rwandan genocide, and criticizes Rwanda's leaders before the genocide, such as Juvenal Habyarimana. According to Susan M. Thomson, the "book is an exercise in public relations, aimed at further enhancing Kagame's stature in the eyes of the west", is one-sided due to heavy reliance on interviews with Kagame and even apologist.

In a 2016 opinion piece, Kinzer wrote that Aleppo had been liberated from the violent militants who had ruled it for three years by Bashar al-Assad's forces, but that the American public had been told "convoluted nonsense" about the war. He added: "At the recent debate in Milwaukee, Hillary Clinton claimed that United Nations peace efforts in Syria were based on 'an agreement I negotiated in June of 2012 in Geneva.' The precise opposite is true. In 2012 Secretary of State Clinton joined Turkey, Saudi Arabia, and Israel in a successful effort to kill Kofi Annan's UN peace plan because it would have accommodated Iran and kept Assad in power, at least temporarily. No one on the Milwaukee stage knew enough to challenge her." Clinton was referencing the Geneva I Conference on Syria, during which principles and guidelines for a power transition were agreed to by the major powers.

In April 2018, he added:

Bibliography

See also
 Timeline of United States military operations

References

External links

 
 Interview with Kinzer for Guernica Magazine
 
 "Empirical Evidence", on WNYC's The Brian Lehrer Show,  April 26, 2006
 Interview with Stephen Kinzer and Martha Cardenas (mp3) February 10, 2008

1951 births
Living people
21st-century American historians
21st-century American male writers
American foreign policy writers
American male non-fiction writers
American newspaper reporters and correspondents
Boston University faculty
Historians of the Central Intelligence Agency
Maria Moors Cabot Prize winners
The New York Times writers
Northwestern University faculty
Brown University faculty
Boston University alumni